Peter McDonnell (c.1874– 24 May 1950) was a New Zealand rugby union player who represented the All Blacks in 1896. His position of choice was wing three-quarter. McDonnell did not play in any test matches as New Zealand did not play their first until 1903.

Career 
Described as "tricky and clever", McDonnell was educated at Wanganui High School and then Te Aute College. McDonnell first played provincially for Hawke's Bay in 1893. The next year he switched to the Wanganui province. He then returned to play for Hawke's Bay in 1895. In 1896 he again represented Wanganui and continued playing in the province until 1900.

It was in 1896, the start of his second stint playing for Wanganui that McDonnell became an All Black. He was called into the team to play Queensland in Wellington after the initial pick, Alfred Wilson, became unable to play because of injury. The game was won 9-0. McDonnell did not score any points in his sole appearance.

Also in 1896, while playing for Wanganui in a 32-0 win over Manawatu, McDonnell became the first player in New Zealand first class history to score four tries in a game.

References 

1950 deaths
People educated at Wanganui High School
People educated at Te Aute College
New Zealand rugby union players
Wanganui rugby union players
New Zealand international rugby union players
Rugby union players from Whanganui